Tornaszentandrás is a village in Borsod-Abaúj-Zemplén County, in Hungary. The name literally means 'Saint Andrew in Torna County'.

Sightseeing
The major sight in the village is the parish church of Saint Andrew dating back to the Árpád dynasty: it has a double apse. In one of apse stands a statue of the patron saint of miners, Saint Barbara. In the other stands a statue of the patron saint of the church, Saint Andrew. The landowners of the village settled miners from Merano, in northern Italy, and their religious tradition is probably reflected in these apses here in Hungary.

Tornaszentandrás is home to extraordinary landscapes, which are especially breathtaking in the early hours.

References

 H. Szabó B. (1979): Árpád-kori emlékek Borsodban. Miskolc
 Gerevich T. (1938): Magyarország románkori emlékei. (Die romanische Denkmäler Ungarns.) Egyetemi nyomda. Budapest 
 Henszlmann, I. (1876): Magyarország ó-keresztyén, román és átmeneti stylü mű-emlékeinek rövid ismertetése, (Old-Christian, Romanesque and Transitional Style Architecture in Hungary). Királyi Magyar Egyetemi Nyomda, Budapest

Outer links
 Tornaszentandrás on a Vendégváró homepage.
 Images of the Tornaszentandrás romanesque church in 3D.

Populated places in Borsod-Abaúj-Zemplén County
Romanesque architecture in Hungary